Stéphanie Dubois was the defending champion, but lost in the final 6–2, 5–2, retired to Eugenie Bouchard.

Seeds

Draw

Finals

Top half

Bottom half

References
Main Draw

Challenger Banque Nationale de Granby
Challenger de Granby